The Virginia House of Delegates is one of the two parts of the Virginia General Assembly, the other being the Senate of Virginia. It has 100 members elected for terms of two years; unlike most states, these elections take place during odd-numbered years. The House is presided over by the Speaker of the House, who is elected from among the House membership by the Delegates. The Speaker is usually a member of the majority party and, as Speaker, becomes the most powerful member of the House. The House shares legislative power with the Senate of Virginia, the upper house of the Virginia General Assembly. The House of Delegates is the modern-day successor to the Virginia House of Burgesses, which first met at Jamestown in 1619. The House is divided into Democratic and Republican caucuses. In addition to the Speaker, there is a majority leader, majority whip, majority caucus chair, minority leader, minority whip, minority caucus chair, and the chairs of the several committees of the House.

Only Maryland, Virginia and West Virginia refer to their lower house as the House of Delegates.

History and location
The House of Burgesses was the first elected legislative body in the New World. Originally having 22 members, the House of Burgesses met from 1619 through 1632 in the choir of the church at Jamestown. From 1632 to 1699 the legislative body met at four different state houses in Jamestown. The first state house convened at the home of Colonial Governor Sir John Harvey from 1632 to 1656. The burgesses convened at the second state house from 1656 until it was destroyed in 1660. Historians have yet to precisely identify its location.

The House of Burgesses had its final meeting in May 1776, and the House of Delegates took its place in October of that year.

The House has met in Virginia's Capitol Building, designed by Thomas Jefferson, since 1788. The legislative body met from 1788 to 1904 in what is known as today the Old Hall of the House of Delegates or commonly referred to as the Old House Chamber. The Old House Chamber is part of the original Capitol building structure. It measures 76 feet in width and is filled today with furnishings that resemble what the room would have looked like during its time of use. There are many bronze and marble busts of historic Virginians on display in the Old House Chamber, including: George Mason, George Wythe, Patrick Henry, Richard Henry Lee, and Meriwether Lewis. From 1904 to 1906, University of Virginia graduate and architect John K. Peeples designed and built compatible classical wings to the west and east side of the Capitol building. The new wings added to provide more space and serve as the legislative chambers in the Virginia General Assembly, the Senate of Virginia resides in the west chamber and the House of Delegates resides in the east chamber. The General Assembly members and staff operate from offices in the General Assembly Building, located in Capitol Square. Prior to 1788 the House of Delegates met in the Colonial Capital of Williamsburg.

In 1999, Republicans took control of the House of Delegates for the first time since Reconstruction (with the exception of a brief 2-year period in which the Readjuster Party was in the majority in the 1880s). The Republican Party held the majority until 2019, when the Democratic Party won a majority of the seats, thus regaining control of the House of Delegates. The majority was sworn in on January 8, 2020, after which Eileen Filler-Corn (D-Fairfax) was elected as the first female and Jewish Speaker of the Virginia House of Delegates.

On November 4, 2020, Virginia voters approved a constitutional amendment that removed the authority to redistrict congressional and state legislative districts from the General Assembly, and gave that power to a newly-established 16-member panel composed of eight lawmakers and eight non-lawmaker citizens. The maps created by this commission are subject to the approval of the General Assembly, but lawmakers cannot change the commission's lines.

Salary and qualifications 
The annual salary for delegates is $17,640 per year. Each delegate represents roughly 84,702 people. Candidates for office must be at least 21 years of age at the time of the election, residents of the districts they seek to represent, and qualified to vote for General Assembly legislators. The regular session of the General Assembly is 60 days long during even numbered years and 30 days long during odd numbered years, unless extended by a two-thirds vote of both houses.

Composition
Article IV, Section 3 of the Constitution of Virginia stipulates that the House of Delegates shall consist of between 90 and 100 members. It does not put any condition on the number of districts and only speaks of "several house districts". While there used to be multi-member districts, since 1982, there have been 100 districts electing one member each.

Current political composition

Historical party control 

(The party control table shows the balance of power after each recent general election. The preceding Makeup table includes results of special elections since the last general election.)

House leadership

Committee chairs and ranking members
The House has 14 standing committees.

Members 
The Virginia House of Delegates is reelected every two years, with intervening vacancies filled by special election. The list below contains the House delegates that are currently serving in the 162nd Virginia General Assembly, which convened in January 2022.

Database of Members past and present
Marking the 400th anniversary of the House of Burgesses, the House Clerk's Office announced a new Database of House Members called "DOME" that chronicles the "9,700-plus men and women who served as burgesses or delegates in the Virginia General Assembly over the past four centuries."

See also
 List of Virginia state legislatures
 Mace of the Virginia House of Delegates
 Political party strength in Virginia
 Redistricting in Virginia
 Virginia House of Delegates elections, 2017
 :Category:Members of the Virginia House of Delegates

Notes

External links
 Virginia General Assembly Official website
 Project Vote Smart – State House of Virginia

House of Delegates
State lower houses in the United States